Kritosaurini is a tribe of saurolophine hadrosaurid dinosaurs from the Late Cretaceous.

Discovery and naming
The first member of the group discovered and named was Kritosaurus; it was named by paleontologist Barnum Brown in 1910. Four years later, Canadian paleontologist Lawrence Lambe would name Gryposaurus. The similarity between the two taxa was immediately recognized, and throughout the twentieth century the validity of the latter genus was doubted, with it being suggested both species were the same. Only in the 1990s were they definitively identified as distinct. Around this time, related hadrosaurs Naashoibitosaurus and Secernosaurus were discovered, and the modern interpretation of the group started to develop.

Kritosaurini as a tribe was first proposed by Michael Brett-Surman in 1989. It was first defined as a clade in 2014 by Albert Prieto-Márquez as "The most exclusive clade of hadrosaurids containing Kritosaurus navajovius Brown, 1910, Gryposaurus notabilis Lambe, 1914, and Naashoibitosaurus ostromi Hunt & Lucas, 1993".

In 2022, Rozadilla et al. described two new kritosaurin genera: Huallasaurus and Kelumapusaura. In their study, they analyzed the relationships of the Kritosaurini and Hadrosauridae as a whole. The results of their phylogenetic analyses within Saurolophinae are displayed in the cladogram below, with Kritosaurini highlighted.

See also
 Timeline of hadrosaur research

Notes

Cretaceous dinosaurs
Saurolophines